Spisanelli is an Italian surname. Notable people with the surname include:

Giulio Spisanelli (died 1658), Italian painter
Vincenzo Spisanelli (1595–1662), Italian painter, father of Giulio

Italian-language surnames